Laurențiu Marin Ivan (born 8 May 1979) is a Romanian former professional footballer who played as a defender and currently a manager. Ivan started and ended his footballer career at Dacia Unirea Brăila, club for which he played in 294 league matches and scored 8 goals. He also played for teams such as: FC Onești, Petrolul Moinești, FC Vaslui or CS Otopeni.

References

External links
 
 

1979 births
Living people
Sportspeople from Brăila
Romanian footballers
Liga I players
Liga II players
AFC Dacia Unirea Brăila players
FC Vaslui players
CS Otopeni players
Association football defenders
Romanian football managers
AFC Dacia Unirea Brăila managers